Mountjoy is a hamlet in the civil parish of Colan in Cornwall, England. It is on the A392 road, east of Quintrell Downs.

References

Hamlets in Cornwall